Anis Haroon is a Pakistani women's rights activist and former caretaker Provincial Minister of Sindh who served in 2013 caretaker ministry.

She is the chairman of the National Commission on the Status of Women.

In 2016, her autobiography was launched.

Early life and education
Haroon was born to a family of Hyderabad Deccan descent. She holds a degree in LLB from University of Karachi.

References

Living people
Provincial ministers of Sindh
Women provincial ministers of Sindh
University of Karachi alumni
Pakistani women's rights activists
Pakistani people of Hyderabadi descent
1947 births